The 2014 Copa ASOBAL was the 25th edition of the Copa ASOBAL. It took place in the Palacio de los Deportes, in León, Castile and León, on 20 & 21 December 2014. The tournament was hosted by ABANCA Ademar León and León city council, being the fifth time León hosts Copa ASOBAL.

FC Barcelona won its tenth title after defeating Fraikin Granollers 37–26 in the Final.

Qualified teams
Qualified teams for this edition are the top three teams on standings at midseason (matchday 15) plus the host team (Ademar León).

Venue

Matches

Semifinals

Final

TV coverage
The tournament was broadcast in Catalonia in Esport3 and nationwide at Spain in Sportmanía and Canal+ Deportes 2 HD. Also worldwide via LAOLA1.tv

Top goalscorers

See also
Liga ASOBAL 2014–15
Copa del Rey de Balonmano 2014–15

References

External links
Official website

2014–15 in Spanish handball
Copa ASOBAL